Ezham Arivu: Search for Tamil Nadu's Young Scientist is a 2016–2017 Indian science reality show which aired on DD Podhigai from 18 August 2016 to 11 August 2017 on Monday to Friday at 7:30PM (IST) for 172 Episodes. The show is hosted by Antony Raj. The motto of the show is a search for Tamilagathin Sirantha Illam Vigyanikana Thedal (Tamil Nadu’s Young Scientist).

The show concept was designed and created by Agnishwar Jayaprakash to pay tribute to the late Dr. APJ Abdul Kalam, Hon. Former President of India whose dream was to enlighten students’ mind through innovation.

About Ezham Arivu
The show is a tailor-made to showcase the different and diverse scientific innovations of the students at the same time the program is value added with inspiring background stories and preparatory clips of students creating the inventions.

This show is aimed at bringing out the young scientist who thinks out of the box, by serving as an ideal platform to exhibit their talent. The show is a tribute to the late Dr. APJ Abdul Kalam, Hon. Former President of India whose dream was to enlighten students’ mind through innovation.

Format of the show
 The top 30 contestants of the program were previewed and shortlisted by Dr APJ Abdul Kalam incidentally this was his last interaction with school children before his death.
 Unique theme based rounds. Viz. Inventions based on Agriculture, Consumer products, Waste Management, Energy etc...
 
 Rapid fire rounds (Agni Paritchai) – In 60 seconds the contestant has to answer questions posed by the judges.
 Daily 6 contestants will be participated, among them least scorers will be eliminated based on their science projects and rapid fire score marks evaluated by judges.
 After daily eliminations, top 6 finalists will be selected.
 Among the top 6 finalists the best will be chosen as a show winner and award them as a Tamilagathin Sirantha Illam Vigyani (Tamil Nadu’s Young Scientist)

References

External links
 Ezham Arivu Episode
 Doordarshan Official Internet site

Podhigai TV television series
Tamil-language reality television series
Tamil-language game shows
2010s Tamil-language television series
2016 Tamil-language television series debuts
Tamil-language television shows
2017 Tamil-language television series endings
Science competitions